Tiia Peltonen (born 8 June 1995) is a Finnish footballer who plays as a defender for Fortuna Hjørring in the Danish Women's League. and has appeared for the Finland women's national team.

Career
Peltonen has been capped for the Finland national team, appearing for the team during the 2019 FIFA Women's World Cup qualifying cycle.

References

External links
 
 
 

1995 births
Living people
Finnish women's footballers
Finland women's international footballers
Women's association football defenders
Footballers from Helsinki